Christine Jacobs-Wagner is a microbial molecular biologist.  She is the William H. Fleming, MD Professor of Molecular, Cellular, and Developmental Biology at Yale University and Professor of Microbial Pathogenesis, HHMI investigator, and director of the Microbial Sciences Institute at Yale Medical School. Jacobs-Wagner's research has shown that bacterial cells have a great deal of substructure, including analogs of microfilaments, and that proteins are directed by regulatory processes to locate to specific places within the bacterial cell. She was elected to the National Academy of Sciences in 2015 and has received a number of scientific awards.

Early life and education 
Christine Jacobs-Wagner grew up in Belgium in a town near Liege. She thought of becoming a cyclist or a badminton Olympian, but was undecided about a career through high school.  Christine Jacobs-Wagner received her BS degree in biochemistry from the University of Liege.  She also received her MS in 1991 and her PhD in 1996 from the University of Liege in Belgium in the field of biochemistry.  She then went to work with Lucy Shapiro at Stanford Medical School on a fellowship from the European Molecular Biology Organization. where she studied Caulobacter, a bacterium with a flagellum on one end and a stalk on the other end, beginning her fascination with how bacterial cells can become asymmetrical. From 2004 to 2019, she taught and conducted research as a professor at Yale University.

Academic career 
As of 2018, Jacobs-Wagner holds an endowed chair in Yale Medical School and is director of their Microbial Institute.

Research 
Christine Jacobs-Wagner's major breakthrough has been the discovery that the tiny cells of bacteria such as Caulobacter, Escherichia coli, and Borrelia are not simply bags of biochemicals but instead program the locations of their protein components via their regulatory systems. She also discovered the protein crescentin, which forms bacterial intermediate filaments, structures once thought to occur only in eukaryotic cells. The current focus of her laboratory's work is to discover regulation of the times and places for critical components of the DNA replication and cell division processes so that proliferation control can be understood.

Awards and recognition 
 National Academy of Sciences (2015)
 Eli Lilly Award American Society of Microbiology (2011)
 WALS lecture National Institute of Health (2009)
 Elizabeth McCoy Lecture
 Finalist, Blatvanik Award for Young Scientists New York Academy of Sciences (2008)
 Women in Cell Biology WICB Junior and Senior Award by American Society of Cell Biology (2007)
 Pew Scholarship Award in the Biomedical Sciences PEW Charitable Trust (2003)
 Grand Prize Winner of the Young Scientist Award GE & Science (1997)

Selected works 
MT Cabeen, C Jacobs-Wagner 2005   “Bacterial Cell Shape” Nature Reviews Microbiology 3 (8):601-610.
O. Sliusarenko, J Heinritz, T Emonet, and C Jacobs-Wagner 2011  “High-throughput, suppixel precision analysis of bacterial morphogenesis and spatio-temporal dynamics.”  Molecular Microbiology 80 (3):612-627.
N Ausmees, JR Kuhn, and C Jacobs-Wagner (2003) “The bacterial cytoskeleton: an intermediate filament-like function in cell shape“ Cell 115 (6): 705-713.
PM Llopis, AF Jackson, O Sliusarenko, I Surovtsev,  J Heinritz, T Emonet...C Jacobs-Wagner (2010)   “Spatial organization of the flow of genetic information in bacteria“ Nature 466 (7302):77-81.
G Laloux and C Jacobs-Wagner (2014) “How do bacteria localize proteins to the cell pole? J Cell Science 127: 11-19. doi:10.1242/jcs.138328
M Cabeen and C Jacobs-Wagner (2010) “The bacterial cytoskeleton” Annu Rev Genetics 44: 365-382.

References 

American microbiologists
American biochemists
American women biochemists
Yale University faculty
Living people
Year of birth missing (living people)
American women academics
21st-century American women